The southern crested newt (Triturus karelinii) is a terrestrial European newt. It is similar to the northern crested newt (Triturus cristatus) except larger and more robust.

In 2013, the Balkan-Anatolian crested newt (Triturus ivanbureschi) was separated from the southern crested newt, and in 2016, the Anatolian crested newt (Triturus anatolicus) was separated from T. ivanbureschi, henceforth just the Balkan crested newt.

Physical characteristics
Southern crested newts are brown to gray dorsally, with darker patches scattered about. Their bellies and throats are orange, with small black dots. They grow up to 7.1 in (18 cm). Males have a large jagged crest from behind their necks down to their tails.

Range
Southern crested newts occur on Crimea, and in the Caucasus and south of the Caspian Sea, whereas the populations on the southeast Balkan peninsula and western Anatolia belong to the Balkan crested newt while those of northern Anatolia belong to the Anatolian crested newt.

Habitat
The southern crested newt lives in a variety of mountain habitats, including both broadleaf and coniferous forests, slopes, and plateaus.

Lifecycle
Sexual maturity is reached at three to four years old. During the breeding season, they are found in most sources of water, such as swamps, lakes, stagnant ponds, ditches and temporary pools, and streams. Males usually live to about eight, and females to 11 years old.

References

External links
http://www.livingunderworld.org/caudata/database/salamandridae/triturus/

Triturus
Amphibians described in 1870